Qualification for the Asian Football Confederation's 1988 AFC Asian Cup finals held in Qatar between 2 and 18 December. Saudi Arabia defeated Republic of Korea in the final match in Doha.

Groups

 * Withdrew

Qualifiaction

Group 1
All matches played in United Arab Emirates.

Group 2
All matches played in Malaysia.

Group 3
All matches played in Nepal.

Group 4
All matches played in Indonesia.

Qualified teams

References
RSSSF details
*"Stiff test for Lions in 1988" The Straits Times, 13 December 1986, Page 38
GSA details

Q
AFC Asian Cup qualification